The Battle of Novara (or Battle of Bicocca; Bicocca being a borough of Novara) was one of the battles fought between the Austrian Empire and the Kingdom of Sardinia during the First Italian War of Independence, within the era of Italian unification. Lasting the whole day of 22 March 1849 and ending at dawn on 23 March, it resulted in a severe defeat and retreat of the Piedmontese (Sardinian) army.

Overview
An uneasy armistice made in 1848 between Austria and Sardinia lasted less than seven months, before Charles Albert, King of Sardinia, denounced the truce on 12 March 1849. The Austrian army took the military initiative in Lombardy. Under the command of Field Marshal Joseph Radetzky von Radetz, it seized the fortress town of Mortara.

Piedmont also suffered from a lack of support from the smaller Italian states. General Girolamo Ramorino was accused of disobeying orders before the Battle of Novara, and, that same year, he was executed.

The Piedmontese were driven back to Borgomanero at the foot of the Alps, and the Austrian forces occupied Novara, Vercelli and Trino, with the road to the Piedmontese capital, Turin, lying open to them.

Aftermath

Austrian general Baron Julius von Haynau subdued Brescia, 54 miles NE of Milan, and Charles Albert abdicated in favor of his son Victor Emmanuel, who would later become the first king of a unified Italy. Friedrich Engels wrote "that, after this defeat, a revolution and proclamation of a republic in Turin is expected, arises from the fact that the attempt is being made to prevent it by the abdication of Charles Albert in favour of his eldest son." A Piedmontese Republic was not created, though a Roman Republic had already been proclaimed in February, and there existed a Venetian Republic as well. Charles Albert exiled himself to Oporto, Portugal, and died shortly thereafter.

A peace treaty was signed on 9 August. Piedmont was forced to pay an indemnity of 65 million francs to Austria. A reenactment of the battle occurs every year. The Austrian frigate Novara, which went on a round-the-world scientific expedition between 1857 and 1859, was named after this Austrian victory.

References

External links 
 Battle of Novara, Forces in the Field, lastoria.org

Novara 1849
Novara 1849
Novara
1849 in Italy
1849 in the Austrian Empire
Novara
March 1849 events
Novara
Joseph Radetzky von Radetz